The 2000 Americas Cricket Cup was an international cricket tournament held in Canada between 7 and 12 August 2000. It was the inaugural edition of what is now the ICC Americas Championship.

The tournament was contested by the five associate members of the International Cricket Council (ICC) located in the ICC Americas development region – Argentina, Bermuda, Canada, the Cayman Islands, and the United States. It was played as a round-robin, with each participant playing the other once. The home team, Canada, won all four of its matches, with Bermuda runner-up. Canada's captain, Joseph Harris, was the player of the tournament.

Teams and squads

Points table

Fixtures

References

International cricket competitions from 1997–98 to 2000
2000
2000 in Canadian cricket
International cricket competitions in Canada
2000 in Ontario
International sports competitions in Toronto